The term high-performance fuzzy computing (HPFC) refers to those technologies able to exploit supercomputers and computer clusters to perform high performance fuzzy logic computations. Thus HPFC is just a special case of the much more general high-performance computing. In the specific case of fuzzy logic, however, there exist more traditional ways to achieve high performance, that could be considered HPFC but in a broader sense, like the hardware implementations on DSP or FPGA. More recently, another alternative has emerged: fuzzy computing on GPU.

References

External links 
  Rapid prototyping of high performance fuzzy computing applications using high level GPU programming for maritime operations support
  Speedup of Implementing Fuzzy Neural Networks with high-dimensional inputs through Parallel Processing on Graphic Processing Units
  Speedup of Fuzzy Clustering Through Stream Processing on Graphics Processing Units
  GPUcomputing.net

Fuzzy logic